Adam Gerżabek (1898–1965) was a Polish painter.

1898 births
1965 deaths
20th-century Polish painters
20th-century Polish male artists
Polish male painters